Sergio may refer to:

 Sergio (given name), for people with the given name Sergio
 Sergio (carbonado), the largest rough diamond ever found
 Sergio (album), a 1994 album by Sergio Blass
 Sergio (2009 film), a documentary film
 Sergio (2020 film), a biographical drama film
 Sergio, the mascot for the Old Orchard Beach Surge baseball team

See also
Hurricane Sergio (disambiguation)